Communications in Belgium are extensive and advanced. Belgium possesses the infrastructure for both mobile and land-based telecom, as well as having significant television, radio and internet infrastructure. The country code for Belgium is BE.

Services

Mail

Mail regulation is a national competency. Postal service in Belgium is in many cases performed by Belgian Post Group, a semi-private public company. Competitors include DHL and UPS.

Postal codes in Belgium consist of four digits which indicate regional areas, e.g. "9000" is the postal code for Ghent.

Telephone

The telephone system itself is highly developed and technologically advanced, with full automation in facilities that handle domestic and international telecom. Domestically speaking, the county has a nationwide cellular telephone system and an extensive network of telephone cables. Telephone regulation is a national competency.

The country code for Belgium is 32 and the international call prefix is 00.

A telephone number in Belgium is a sequence of nine or ten numbers dialled on a telephone to make a call on the telephone network in Belgium. Belgium is under a closed telephone numbering plan, but retains the trunk code, "0", for all national dialling.

Fixed telephones
There were 4.668 million land telephone lines in use in Belgium in 2007, a slight decrease on the 4.769 million in use in 1997.

The majority state-owned public telephone company of Belgium is Proximus. Some other or private operators exist, as Scarlet (Proximus) and Base (KPN).

Mobile telephones
Mobile telephone ownership has increased by nearly one thousand percent in the period 1997–2007, from 974,494 to 10.23 million.

There are three licensed mobile network operators (MNO) in Belgium, Proximus (Belgacom), Orange Belgium (Orange S.A.) and Telenet/Base and numerous mobile virtual network operators (MVNO).

A fourth license will be auctioned off by the government in January 2010.

Internet
There were 61 (2003) internet service providers in Belgium, serving 8.113 million internet users in 2009. The country code for Belgian websites is .be.

In September 2009 in Flanders there were 3,048,260 broadband internet customers (DSL and cable), of which 2,520,481 were residential users and 527,779 business users. Only 65,175 dial-up internet access accounts remained in the residential market and 9,580 in the business market.

Internet providers

xDSL Internet Providers
Belgium has numerous copper cable internet providers:
 Altercom *End service 2011
 Base
 Proximus
 Destiny
 Digiweb
 EDPnet
 Evonet
 Full Telecom
 Interxion
 iPFix
 LCL
 Mobistar (Orange S.A.) *End service : 2013
 Numericable (France Numericable)
 Perceval
 Portima
 Proximedia Group
 Scarlet (Belgacom)
 Verizon Business (Verizon Communications)
 Ergatel

Only Belgacom and Numericable currently offers fixed telephony and digital television in a triple play formula. All other companies offer also fixed telephony in a duo play formula.

Cable Internet Providers
Belgium has three major fiberglass cable internet providers:
 Numéricable for the Brussels region (Ypso Holding)
 Telenet for the Flanders and Brussels regions (Liberty Global)
 VOO for the Walloon and Brussels regions (TECTEO)
Orange Belgium use Telenet and VOO network combined
These companies all offer fixed telephony and digital television in a triple play formula.
 Interoute Managed Services
 Interxion
 LCL
 Nucleus
 Verizon Business (Verizon Communications)

These companies all offer specialised services.

Terrestrial Internet Providers
 Clearwire in Brussels, Ghent, Leuven, Aalst, Halle and Vilvoorde (Sprint Nextel)
 Perceval

Satellite Internet Providers
 Verizon Business (Verizon Communications)

ISP for public services
 The Brussels Regional Informatics Center (BRIC, Centre d'Informatique pour la Région Bruxelloise in French) offers Internet access to public administrations in the Brussels-Capital Region, relying directly on the national Belnet network and the IRISnet network.

Not categorized
Other ISP are Chat.be, Connexeon, HostIT, Microsoft Belgium, Netlog, Ulysse, Ven Brussels, Rack66 (EUSIP bvba), WSD Hosting.

Other
The microwave relay network is, however, more limited. For international communications, Belgium has 5 submarine cables and a number of satellite earth stations, two of which are Intelsat, and one Eutelsat.

References

External links

 BIPT - Belgian Institute for Postal Services and Telecommunications
 ISPA - Internet Service Providers Association of Belgium
 DNS - Domain Name System Belgium
 MAVISE - Belgian TV market
 Agoria - Federation of Belgian IT Employers
 Beltug - Federation of Belgian ICT Professionals
 UPP - Union of Belgian Periodical Press Publishers
 Febelma - Belgian Federation of Magazines
 VRM - Flemish Media Regulator (Dutch community)
 CSA - High Council for the Audiovisual Media (French community)
 MDGB - Germanic Media Council of Belgium (Germanic community)